The state broadcaster Kuwait Television operates the domestic channels, including KTV1 (music shows, news, current affairs and official conferences coverage), KTV2 (family programmes in English, Kuwaiti TV series subbed in English and English Movies subbed in Arabic) and KTV Sport (formerly KTV3).

There are 28 free-to-air satellite channels headquartered in Kuwait, 21 of which are privately owned. Direct-to-home is the dominant platform in the pay-television market. KCV is the only provider of cable television.

List of channels

Official channels
KTV 1
Kuwait Plus
KTV 2 in English
 Al Majlis 
 Al Gurain 
KTV 3 Sports channel
KTV 3 Sport Plus Second Sports channel
Al-Arabi TV  documentary Channel

Al-Resalah TV
Alafasy TV

Other channels
Alrai TV
Funoon TV
Scope TV
Alwatan TV
Alwatan Plus
Alwatan Ghanawi
Al-Kout TV

Alsabah TV
Al-Bawadi TV
Al Shahed TV HD
Kuwait News TV
rawasy TV
qadsawi TV
Kuwait Space Channel
Fox
National Geographic
Nat Geo Wild
BabyTV
Disney Channel
Cartoon Network
Boomerang
HBO
HBO2 (formerly HBO Comedy)
HBO Zone (formerly Cartoon Network Too)
Cinemax
Fashion TV
Disney Junior
Disney XD
AMC
CBS Drama
CBS Reality
CBS Action
Horror Channel
bTV (Bulgaria)
Rai 1
MTV
Nickelodeon
Comedy Central  (formerly Paramount Comedy & The Paramount Channel)                                                                                                            
TVB Pearl
E! (Asia)
Comedy Central
BET Network
VTV1
AXN
AXN White
AXN Black
AXN Movies
Egyptian Radio and Television Union
FashionTV HD
National Geographic HD
Nat Geo Wild HD
MTV HD
Nickelodeon HD
E! HD
Kanal D
Crime & Investigation
History
National Geographic Abu Dhabi
Discovery Channel
TLC
Discovery Kids 
Discovery HD
DMAX
MBC1
MBC2
TV+ (MENA)
ETV1
ETV2

See also

 List of Arabic-language television channels

References